Cuvier Grover (July 24, 1828 – June 6, 1885) was a career officer in the United States Army and a general in the Union Army during the American Civil War.

Biography
Grover was born in Bethel, Maine, the younger brother of Governor and Senator La Fayette Grover of Oregon. A graduate of the United States Military Academy in 1850, Grover was stationed in the western frontier before being transferred to help in defense preparations of Washington, D.C., at the outbreak of the Civil War. He was appointed brigadier general of volunteers in April 1862, but with a date of rank of April 14, 1861, the day after the evacuation of Fort Sumter, making him the most senior general in the United States Volunteer Army. He served as a brigade commander in the III Corps of the Army of the Potomac, in which role he won distinction at the Battle of Williamsburg and was brevetted lieutenant colonel in the regular army, and winning promotion to full colonel for gallantry at the Battle of Seven Pines. 

His brigade was later transferred to the command of Maj. Gen. John Pope and cited for bravery in leading a bayonet charge against Confederate forces of Stonewall Jackson at the Second Battle of Bull Run.

Grover was transferred to the Department of the Gulf in December 1862 and commanded a division in the XIX Corps during the capture of Baton Rouge and the Siege of Port Hudson. Returning to the East in August 1864, he participated in the Third Battle of Winchester, Fisher's Hill, and Cedar Creek, where he was wounded and brevetted to the rank of major general of volunteers. Before the war's end, Grover was brevetted to major general in the regular army on March 13, 1865, before returning to frontier and garrison duty with the U.S. Cavalry.

Grover died in Atlantic City, New Jersey, and is buried in West Point Cemetery.

See also

List of American Civil War generals (Union)

Notes

References
 Eicher, John H., and Eicher, David J., Civil War High Commands, Stanford University Press, 2001, .
 Hennessy, John J., Return to Bull Run: The Campaign and Battle of Second Manassas, University of Oklahoma Press, 1993, .
 Linedecker, Clifford L., ed., Civil War, A-Z: The Complete Handbook of America's Bloodiest Conflict, New York: Ballantine Books, 2002, .
 Warner, Ezra J., Generals in Blue: Lives of the Union Commanders, Louisiana State University Press, 1964, .

External links

Portrait of Grover in uniform. Full title: "General Cuvier Grover, Commanding the Union Troops at Baton Rouge, Louisiana." From Frank Leslie's Illustrated Newspaper.

1828 births
1885 deaths
People from Bethel, Maine
People of Maine in the American Civil War
Union Army generals
United States Military Academy alumni
Burials at West Point Cemetery